Baderic, Baderich, Balderich or Boderic (ca. 480 – 529), son of Bisinus and Menia, was a co-king of the Thuringii. He and his brothers Hermanfrid and Berthar succeeded their father Bisinus. After Hermanfrid defeated Berthar in battle, he invited King Theuderic I of Metz to help him defeat Baderic in return for half of the kingdom. Theuderic I agreed and Baderic was defeated and killed in 529. Hermanfrid became the sole king.

Baderic is known to have two daughters: Ingund and Aregund, who became the 3rd and 4th wives respectively of Clothar I, King of the Franks.

Notes

480s births
529 deaths
Germanic warriors
Kings of the Thuringians
6th-century rulers in Europe
Year of birth uncertain